Colletotrichum trichellum is a fungal plant pathogen. It is known for causing leaf and stem spot in English Ivy.

References

External links

trichellum
Fungal plant pathogens and diseases
Eudicot diseases
Fungi described in 1817